Indian Creek Village may refer to:

Indian Creek Village, Maryland
Indian Creek, Florida